Brad Bell (born September 1, 1961) is an American professional golfer.

Bell was born in Sacramento, California. He played college golf at UC Davis and UCLA where he was a two-time All-American.

Bell played on the European Tour in 1986 and 1987 where his best finish was T-37 at the 1986 Scandinavian Enterprise Open. He played on the Ben Hogan Tour (now Nationwide Tour) in 1990, winning the Ben Hogan South Texas Open. He played on the PGA Tour in 1991 and 1992, where his best finish was T-14 at the 1992 Buick Southern Open.

Bell is now a golf course architect with his own design company, Brad Bell Golf Course Design.

Professional wins (2)

Ben Hogan Tour wins (1)

Other wins (1)
1989 California State Open

See also
1990 PGA Tour Qualifying School graduates
1991 PGA Tour Qualifying School graduates

References

External links

American male golfers
UCLA Bruins men's golfers
PGA Tour golfers
European Tour golfers
Golf course architects
Golfers from Sacramento, California
University of California, Davis alumni
1961 births
Living people